Rage is a steel roller coaster situated at Adventure Island in Southend-on-Sea, Essex, England. Rage is a Gerstlauer Euro-Fighter model roller coaster (the 6th overall to be built). At 97 degrees, it is steeper-than-vertical and tied for the third steepest roller coaster in the United Kingdom. 
it is also tied five ways between itself, Fahrenheit, Speed: No Limits, SpongeBob SquarePants Rock Bottom Plunge, Typhoon, and Vild-Svinet.

History and description
Designed by Werner Stengel, the coaster opened on 10 February 2007. When it was built, the coaster became the tallest structure in the park and one of the tallest structures in the nearby area. Riders on the coaster are offered expansive views of the nearby North Sea from the Southend-on-Sea beach. The coaster has a total of three inversions: a vertical loop, a cutback and a heartline roll. The coaster also has a helix near the end of the ride. As with other Euro-Fighter model coasters, the coaster has trains that consist of individual cars. Riders in these cars are in two rows of four, for a total of 8 riders. The coaster layout for Rage is particularly close to two other Euro-Fighter (model 320+) roller coasters: Falcon at Duinrell amusement park and Untamed at Canobie Lake Park.

Reviews
In 2009, Andy Akinwolere, a presenter for the Children's BBC show Blue Peter, rated Rage as the "most thrilling roller coaster" in the United Kingdom. Akinwolere, who wore a heart monitor to record his physiological reactions, reported that the coaster was "less scary than other rides, but...[offered] really intense excitement all the way through."

Incidents
Despite the fact that the nest was mere inches from the track itself, engineers at the park examined the nest and its location and determined that the nest's location did not pose a threat to coaster riders or the birds. The crows were also observed to be seemingly undisturbed by the coaster's operation.

References

External links

Roller coasters introduced in 2007
Roller coasters in the United Kingdom